Ryan is an unincorporated community in Loudoun County, Virginia, United States. The community was once at the corner of Shellhorn, Ryan, and Waxpool roads. It is now a part of the Ashburn communities.

Unincorporated communities in Loudoun County, Virginia
Washington metropolitan area
Unincorporated communities in Virginia